Ralph Knoesen (26 August 1941 – 8 September 2005) was a South African boxer. He competed in the men's flyweight event at the 1960 Summer Olympics. At the 1960 Summer Olympics, he lost to Antoine Porcel of France in the Round of 32.

References

External links
 

1941 births
2005 deaths
South African male boxers
Olympic boxers of South Africa
Boxers at the 1960 Summer Olympics
Sportspeople from Pietermaritzburg
Flyweight boxers